Alana Grace is an American actress and singer-songwriter who is best known for her song "Black Roses Red" on the soundtrack of Sisterhood of the Traveling Pants.

Early life 
Grace was born in Los Angeles, California, but moved with her family at the age of 6 to Nashville, Tennessee, where, she attended Harpeth Hall.

In 2002, at the age of 14, she was one of seven finalists chosen by music industry professionals at the second annual Nashville Grammy Showcase, hosted by the Nashville Chapter of the National Academy of Recording Arts and Sciences.

Career 
Grace is primarily a singer-songwriter, but has also studied dance and has acted in an NBC Movie of the Week and several TV specials, among them a TNN Entertainment Special. On June 1, 2005, she performed her song "Black Roses Red" on The Today Show on NBC. Grace studies vocal training with Brett Manning.

Grace's first album, Break The Silence, was released by Columbia Records. After the album didn't sell as well as she expected, she began to focus more on increasing her online audience. By 2008, Walmart had bought exclusive rights to sell her music.

Grace released her second album, With One Word, on Fragile Heart Records on April 10, 2009. She performed on the Vans Warped Tour to promote its release. In March 2010, a new Grace song, "7 Month Itch", from her third album, was premiered on her official website for streaming.

Grace is the lead vocalist of the band This Is She (formerly known as TOY). This Is She began with the Warped Tour 2009, when Grace's earlier solo project was playing on the same stages as After Midnight Project, which included Ryan Folden (drums) and Christian Paul Meadows (guitar). Grace needed a full band in 2011 and chose Folden and Meadows following the dissolution of After Midnight Project. This Is She embarked on a European tour with the Italian goth metal band Lacuna Coil in October and November 2012. Ater this tour, This Is She broke up. From 2013, Grace began working as a DJ.

Discography

Albums
 Break The Silence (February 27, 2007)
 With One Word (April 10, 2009)
 ''Nobody Is Ok (This Is She) (July 3, 2012)

References

External links
Official web site

Living people
Singers from California
Year of birth missing (living people)
21st-century American women singers
21st-century American singers